The Hong Kong Club is the first gentlemen's club in Hong Kong. Opened on 26 May 1846, it is a private business and dining club in the heart of Central, Hong Kong.  Its members were (and still are) among the most influential people in the city, including such personalities as senior government officials, senior local businessmen, the heads of the major trading firms, and many legal and accounting professionals. It was often referred to simply as "The Club". The club's first premises were situated on Queen's Road at the junction with D'Aguilar Street.

The 2021/22 Chairman was Mr. Martin Allies, who succeeded Dr. Frank K Innes. On 12 May 2022 Mr. Paul J Brough was appointed Chairman, and Mr. Michael A McCoy, Vice-chairman, for the forthcoming year. The General Manager of the Club is Mr. Patrick Behrens. 

The Club marked the 176th anniversary of its founding on 26 May 2021. 

in 2016, the Club set out its history in a book entitled Kindred Spirits.

History

The Club was an exclusive gentlemen's club set up by British merchants and civil servants, to "create a greater community of feeling among these classes". At the outset, an entrance fee of $30 was payable , and monthly subscription fees of $4 were charged quarterly in advance.

The Club was historically described as the seat of real power in Hong Kong: "Here the Governor and senior civil servants would sit in regular, informal sessions, usually over breakfast or lunch, with members of the commercial elite". In 1877, the club witnessed an intrusion by a British soldier who was enraged by the privileges of the official and merchant classes. The lone assailant wandered into the club brandishing a sword, swinging it at the lamps and chandeliers, and menacing members saying: "You're one of them".

The Club moved into new premises in Jackson Road in 1897, and the old premises became home for the short-lived 'New Club', a residential club whose members were almost entirely master mariners.

Governor Sir Cecil Clementi (1925–30) believed the club to be too exclusive, and suggested abolishing it, and replacing it with a club whose membership would be open to all races.

In the late 1970s, the club was said to be running at a deficit. In 1978, it recorded a deficit of HK$200,000 after including investment income of HK$883,000, and members accused the General Committee of poor management.

In May 1981, a group of members fighting to preserve the Victorian clubhouse built in 1897 called an Emergency General Meeting with a motion to wind up the club and distribute its assets. The motion was rejected by 451:147.

Membership
Rules of membership were strict: Membership was restricted to British merchants and civil servants, women and people of unsuitable background being banned.

Membership remained exclusive to Europeans until the membership rules were eased in the late 1970s. Some parts of the club premises were off-limits to women.  One former member is quoted as saying ""there was nothing in the rules to say that Chinese couldn't join. It had simply been understood that you didn't put a Chinese up for membership". There were reportedly only a few Chinese members as recently as in the early 1980s. The Sex Discrimination Ordinance, which came into force in 1996, eventually forced its doors open to women.

The club reportedly had 1,218 members on its membership register in 1981. In 2007, the club has some 1,400 members, of which 70% are expatriates.

At the end of 2021 the Club had 1,482 members and approximately 240 full-time staff.

In 2015 the Club established The Hong Kong Club Foundation for charitable purposes to which the Club has donated over HK$40 million to date. The Foundation is separately managed from the Club and, since its establishment, Mr. John Budge has served as its Chairman.

Clubhouse

The Hong Kong Club Building is currently in its third generation, in its second location. Prior to its 1980s redevelopment the previous Hong Kong Club Building was famous for being one of the last examples of Victorian architecture in Hong Kong. The first clubhouse was constructed on the corner of D'Aguilar St and Queen's Road. The cost of its construction, together with furniture, of £15,000 was financed through an issue of shares of £100 each.

On 16 February 1895, the Club was granted a 999-year lease on the current site, and a new clubhouse was completed there in 1897.

The Club currently occupies eight floors (LG2, LG1, Ground, 1st, 2nd, 3rd and 4th floor, and a fitness centre on the 6th floor) of The Hong Kong Club Building.  Facilities include a billiard room, a bowling alley, library, card room, and dining and bar facilities.

References

Central, Hong Kong
Gentlemen's clubs in Hong Kong
Organizations established in 1846
1846 establishments in the British Empire